The ACM/IEEE '''International Conference on Human-Robot Interaction (HRI)''' is an annual conference "focusing on human-robot interaction with roots in robotics, psychology, cognitive science, human computer interaction (HCI), human factors, artificial intelligence, organizational behavior, anthropology, and other fields".  The conference is a joint undertaking of the Association for Computing Machinery (ACM) and the Institute of Electrical and Electronics Engineers (IEEE) organizations.

See also
ACM 
ACM SIGAI
IEEE

References

External links
 ACM web site
 IEEE web site
 HCI 2016 conference site

Software engineering conferences